Roman Tesorio Villame (November 18, 1932 – May 18, 2007), better known as Yoyoy Villame, was a Filipino singer, composer, lyricist, actor and comedian.

Early life
A native of Calape, Bohol Province, Villame was the youngest of ten children of a fisherman father and fishseller mother. He started composing songs for the Boy Scouts in his elementary days. Dropping out after his second year in high school, Villame enlisted to become a soldier-trainee of the Philippine Army. Being unhappy in his post in Pampanga, he asked for a discharge after the surrender of rebel leader Luis Taruc. He became a passenger jeepney driver plying the Baclaran-Pasay Taft-Santa Cruz-Dimasalang route. During the ten years of driving jeeps, he would compete in amateur nights held at Plaza Miranda in Quiapo only to lose, reportedly due to his strong Visayan accent.

In 1965, Villame went back to Bohol to become a bus driver, where he formed a rondalla band with some fellow drivers; he sang and played the mandolin. His first recording was in 1972 and entitled "Magellan", a parody of historicism of Ferdinand Magellan's failed conquest of the Philippines. This became the top-selling record in the Visayas-Mindanao region. Comedian Chiquito recognized his potential and brought Villame to Manila to be signed to Vicor Records, which re-issued most of the Kinampay catalogue. Touring Pampanga, Nueva Ecija and other parts of Luzon helped Villame establish his name in the country.

Villame was the first to brand his music as "novelty" to distinguish himself from his contemporaries, who tried hard to sound like Perry Como or Frank Sinatra. It was the beginning of a long list of albums and recordings of his politically inspired songs in Bisaya, Tagalog and English.

Career
Villame blended Filipino folk melodies, popular tunes and nursery rhymes for his music and then added witty, comedic lyrics that mixed Tagalog, Cebuano and English in a form of grammar that he concocted. He also sings about the Filipinos daily experiences such as the traffic congestion in the country in the song "Trapik". He became a national figure in 1977 with his near-anthemic "Mag-exercise Tayo", which has been adopted by government agencies and public schools as the official music for their Monday morning exercise after the flag ceremony.

His most popular song was "Butse Kik", a song written from made-up Chinese-sounding words which Villame allegedly came up with by writing down the names of Chinese stores while waiting for a mechanic to fix his broken-down jeepney in Manila's Chinatown; it borrowed from the tune of Dee Dee Sharp's "Baby Cakes", a 1962 hit. The song would then be covered by a host of artists, Aiza Seguerra and The Company to name a few. The Chinese community in Cebu felt slighted by the song but dropped plans to bring Villame to court because not a single Chinese word was included in the song. The song was actually released by Villame earlier in his career originally under the title "Vietcong Palagdas" with the Embees and the MB Rondalla Band through Kinampay Records.

Villame wrote "Philippine Geography", which lists 77 major islands, provinces, cities, municipalities, and towns in the Philippines from north to south. He also established a love team with "Barok Labs Dabiana" and celebrated his fisherman father with "Piyesta ng Mga Isda". His song "Take It, Take It" ("Pasko ng Fiasco") took potshots at the Manila Film Festival scam in the 1990s. He made more than 25 albums and won several sales awards, among them a double platinum for his album Tirana My Dear and a platinum for McArthur and Dagohoy in 1991. He also won Best Novelty Award for "Piyesta ng mga Isda" at the 1993 Awit Awards. His long list of hits and his entertaining style of music earned him the title of 'King of Philippine Novelty Songs'.

Villame began making film in the early 1970s with the help of Chiquito. His first on-screen appearance was in Isla Limasawa, where "Magellan" was used as theme song. In 2004, he played a Visayan troubadour in the critically acclaimed film, Babae sa Breakwater ("Woman of the Breakwater"). In doing over 50 films, Villame is most noted for his role in the 1974 suspense thriller Biktima. His song "My Country, My Philippines" was played in the opening scene of the film Ang Pagdadalaga ni Maximo Oliveros, while his songs landed in the soundtrack for the film Pepot Artista.

On July 21, 1989, Villame was one of the passengers of the BAC 1-11 airplane when it overran an airport runway and crashed into a busy highway in Las Piñas; none of the passengers perished, with Villame uninjured, but eight people who were on the highway died from the crash.

He moved to Las Piñas, where he became a city councilor for ten years. He then ran for vice-mayor in 1995 on a platform focused against illegal drugs but lost.

Personal life
Villame lived with his wife Tessie and their six children, including singer Hannah Villame. He became a member of Members Church of God International known for its TV/internet program Ang Dating Daan.

Death
Villame died of cardiac arrest on May 18, 2007.
He was buried at Calape Catholic Cemetery in Calape, Bohol Province.

Discography

Albums

Singles
"Paregla sa Mga Batan-on" / "Caingit Rock" (1971) 
"Gobiyerno sa Kadagatan" / "Sa Idad Pa Ako'g Sixteen" (1971) 
"Magellan" / "Dagohoy" / "Tsuper ng Jeepney" (1971) 
"Kinilaw" / "Ay Loleng" (1972) 
"Ang Perlas" (Side B, 1972) 
"I Shall Return" / "Columbus" (1972) 
"Crabs Administration" (1972) 
"Wa Na Gyud" / "Batasan Nga Bag-o" (1972) 
"Kundansoy Cha Cha" / "Day" 
"Isprakenhayt" (1973) 
"Kanser" / "Bungalow" (1977) 
"Duha" / "Boy Scout Na Ko" (1977) 
"Tarzan at Barok" / "Mag-Exercise Tayo" (1977) 
"Philippine Geography" / "Welcome Balikbayan" (1977) 
"Nasaan Ka Darling" / "Exercise Boogie" (1977) 
"Granada '78" / "Sabi Barok Lab Ko Dariana" (1978) 
"Gugmang Dinalian" (Side B; 1978) 
"Super Hopia Disco" (with Max Surban and Fred Panopio) / "Kawawa Naman Ako" (1978) 
"Bayle sa Tibuok Kalibutan" / "Pagkamingaw" (1978) 
"Mag-Flower Dance Kita" / "Gi-Indyan" (1978) 
"Rapido Rock" / "Bombero" (1980) 
"Tigmo" / "Gaksa" (1980) 
"Misteryo ni Herodes" / "Christmas ng Isang Bilanggo" 
"Aha... Hala Ka" / "Si Felimon, si Felimon" (1982) 
"Happy Birthday" (1983) 
"Sangla Lupa Punta Saudi" 
"Wooly Booly" / "Ang Classmate Kong Alien" (1989) 
"Piyesta (ng Mga Isda)" / "Tweedle Tweedle Dam" (1993)
"Likas-Yaman" (1993)
"Lilibee" (Side B, 1994)
"Ring-Ting-A-Ling Ding-Dong" (Side B, 1994)

Filmography

Film

Isla Limasawa (1972)
Eh, Kasi Bisaya (1972)
Los Compadres (1973)
Cariñosa (1973)
Telebong, Telebong, Telebong (1973)
"Sinbad" The Tailor (1973)
Prinsipe Abante (1973)
Abogado de Campanilla (1973)
Isprakenhayt (1973)
Jack and the Magic Beans (1974)
Biktima (1974)
Batul of Mactan (1974)
Enter Garote (1974)
Pepe and Pilar (1975)
Anino sa Villa Lagrimas (1976)
Sabi Barok Lab Ko Dabiana (1978)
Ang Sisiw Ay Osang Agila (1979)
Dabiana and Barok (1980)
Barok Goes to Hong Kong (1984)
Wooly Booly: Ang Classmate Kong Alien (1989)
Tootsie Wootsie (1990)
Titser's Enemi No. 1 (1990)
Bikining Itim (1990)
Hulihin si... Nardong Toothpick (1990)
Ang Titser Kong Alien: Wooly Booly II (1990)
Humanap Ka ng Panget (1991)
Andrew Ford Medina: Huwag Kang Gamol (1991)
Ober Da Bakod (The Movie) (1994)
Once Upon a Time in Manila (1994)
Tunay na Magkaibigan, Walang Iwanan... Peksman (1994)
Milyonaryong Mini (1996)
Sis (2001)
Pepot Artista (2004)
Babae sa Breakwater (2004)

Television
T.O.D.A.S. (IBC 13)
T.O.D.A.S. Again (IBC 13)
Alabang Girls (TV5)
Toink: Hulog ng Langit (GMA 7)
D'on Po sa Amin (New Vision 9) - Gilbert Magaling
Eat Bulaga! (New Vision 9, ABS-CBN, GMA 7)
Bubble Gang (GMA 7) – guest/himself
Maynila (GMA 7)
Idol Ko si Kap (GMA 7)
Milyonaryong Mini (with Max Surban) (ABS-CBN Regional)

Hokus Pokus (GMA 7) – His last TV role
Tunay na Buhay (GMA 7) – Posthumously featured

References

External links

1932 births
2007 deaths
20th-century Filipino male singers
Filipino male comedians
Filipino male film actors
Filipino singer-songwriters
Male actors from Bohol
Metro Manila city and municipal councilors
People from Las Piñas
Singers from Bohol
20th-century comedians
Vicor Music artists